Tsuchiyama may refer to:

 8044 Tsuchiyama, a main-belt asteroid
 Tsuchiyama-juku, one of the 52 Stations of the Tōkaidō
 Tsuchiyama, Shiga, a former town in Japan which merged into the city of Kōka in 2004
 Tsuchiyama Station, a railway station in Harima, Japan

People with the surname 
 Tamie Tsuchiyama (1915–1984), American anthropologist

Japanese-language surnames